The Royal Curragh Golf Club is a private members' club with an 18-hole golf course in County Kildare, Ireland. Dating from 1858, it is the oldest golf club in Ireland. Located next to Curragh Camp, its course has historically had strong links to the military.

History

Foundation
The golf club was founded in 1858, with the then Lord Lieutenant of Ireland, Archibald Montgomerie, 13th Earl of Eglinton, reputedly being a "frequent visitor to the course".

Royal title
On 21 September 1910, the Curragh Golf Club was granted a Royal charter and was renamed the Royal Curragh Golf Club. After the Irish Free State was granted independence in 1922, however, the club reverted to the name Curragh Golf Club. In 1981, William Gibson, Commandant of the Club, received confirmation from the Home Office in Westminster that the royal title had never been withdrawn. In May 2011, the State visit by Elizabeth II to the Republic of Ireland, the first royal visit since that of George V in 1911, was seen as popular and marked a new relationship between Britain and Ireland. In 2013, the club voted to restore the Royal prefix, and its name reverted to the Royal Curragh Golf Club.

Course
The present course opened in 2007 and was designed by Patrick Merrigan. It has a length of 6586 yards and a par of 72. The course is built on The Curragh plain.

See also
List of golf clubs granted Royal status

References

Royal Curragh
Organisations based in the Republic of Ireland with royal patronage
1858 establishments in Ireland
Sports clubs in County Kildare
Royal golf clubs